The 2012 Meineke Car Care Bowl of Texas, the seventh edition of the game, was a post-season American college football bowl game held on December 28, 2012 at Reliant Stadium in Houston, Texas as part of the 2012-13 NCAA football bowl season. The game, which was the final game of the 2012 NCAA Division I FBS football season for both teams, was broadcast at 8 PM CT on ESPN, and featured the Minnesota Golden Gophers from the Big Ten Conference against the Texas Tech Red Raiders from the Big 12 Conference. The Golden Gophers accepted their invitation after finishing the regular season at six-wins, six-losses, while the Red Raiders accepted their invitation following a campaign during which they totaled seven-wins, five-losses. This was not the first time the Golden Gophers and Red Raiders met in a bowl game; the two teams had previously met in the 2006 Insight Bowl, with the Red Raiders winning 44–41 in overtime.

Teams

Minnesota

The Golden Gophers finished at the bottom of the Big Ten's Legends Division, only posting a 2–6 mark in conference play. However, because of their 6–6 record, the Golden Gophers were bowl eligible for the first time since 2009, accepting a bid to the Meineke Car Care Bowl of Texas their bid to the game, their first Meineke Car Care Bowl appearance.

Texas Tech

The Red Raiders finished in a tie for fifth place in the Big 12 at 4–5 in conference play, holding tiebreakers ahead of the TCU Horned Frogs and West Virginia Mountaineers but behind the Baylor Bears. Soon after Minnesota accepted their invitation, the Red Raiders did the same. Although this was also the Red Raiders' first appearance in the Meineke Car Care Bowl of Texas, the Red Raiders played in three previous bowl games in Houston: the 1976 Bluebonnet Bowl, the 2000 Galleryfurniture.com Bowl, and the 2003 Houston Bowl.

The Red Raiders' passing attack was the second-best in the country, averaging 362 yards per game.

Game summary

Scoring summary

Statistics

Source:

References

External links
 Game summary at ESPN

Meineke Car Care Bowl of Texas
Texas Bowl
Minnesota Golden Gophers football bowl games
Texas Tech Red Raiders football bowl games
Meineke Car Care Bowl of Texas
Meineke Car Care Bowl of Texas
Meineke Car Care Bowl of Texas